Samuele is an 1821 Italian-language oratorio by Simon Mayr to a libretto by Bartolomeo Merelli. It was performed on 2 June 1821 in Bergamo's  Congregazione della Carità by pupils of the Lezioni caritatevoli to welcome the arrival of the new bishop Pietro Mola.

Recordings
 Samuele Franz Hauk 2CDs Naxos

References

1821 compositions
Oratorios by Simon Mayr